Gornje Vrhovine is a village in Croatia, known until 1961 as Crna Vlast.

References

Populated places in Lika-Senj County
Serb communities in Croatia